Cazasu is a commune located in Brăila County, Muntenia, Romania. It is composed of a single village, Cazasu. It was part of Tudor Vladimirescu Commune until 2003, when it was split off to form a separate commune.

References

Communes in Brăila County
Localities in Muntenia